Samuel Anthony "Sam" Nixon, Jr. (born November 9, 1958) is an American politician. He served in the Virginia House of Delegates from March 1994 to April 2010, representing the 27th district in Chesterfield County, the southern suburbs of Richmond. From 2010 until 2015, he was the Chief Information Officer of the state, and head of the Virginia Information Technologies Agency (VITA).

In March 2015, Nixon assumed the position of Chief Administrative Officer of the Virginia State Corporation Commission having been nominated by the commissioners of that agency.

Electoral history

References

External links

1958 births
Living people
Republican Party members of the Virginia House of Delegates
James Madison University alumni
People from Chesterfield County, Virginia
21st-century American politicians